Hibbertia persquamata is a species of flowering plant in the family Dilleniaceae and is endemic to the Northern Kimberley region of Western Australia. It is a spreading to prostrate shrub with flattened, scaly branches, narrow elliptic leaves and yellow flowers arranged singly in leaf axils with 20 to 26 stamens arranged around three scaly carpels.

Description

Taxonomy
This hibbertia was first formally described in 2010 by Hellmut R. Toelken, and given the name Hibbertia complanata in the Journal of the Adelaide Botanic Gardens from specimens collected in 1992 on Augustus Island. Later in 2010, in a subsequent edition of the Journal of the Adelaide Botanic Gardens, Toelken changed the name to Hibbertia persquamata because the name H. complanata was already in use for a different taxon (H. complanata (R.Br. ex DC.) J.W.Horn). The specific epithet (persquamata) means "densely covered with scales".

Toelken described two subspecies of H. complanata, later changed to subspecies of H. persquamata, and the names are accepted by the Australian Plant Census:
 Hibbertia persquamata Toelken subsp. persquamata has smaller leaf scales than subspecies ampliata and has been observed flowering in May and June.

Distribution and habitat
Subspecies ampliata grows in grassy eucalypt woodland on the lower Prince Regent River and subspecies persquamata is only known from Augustus Island where it grows in grassy Acacia woodland.

Conservation status
Both subspecies of Hibbertia persquamata are classified as "not threatened" by the Western Australian Government Department of Parks and Wildlife.

See also
List of Hibbertia species

References

persquamata
Eudicots of Western Australia
Plants described in 2010
Taxa named by Hellmut R. Toelken